The Missionary Diocese of All Saints (MDAS) is a non-geographical diocese of the Anglican Church in North America, comprising 31 parishes in 14 American states: Washington, Arizona, Texas, Michigan, Ohio, Kentucky, Florida, New York, Colorado, New Mexico, South Carolina, Virginia, Maryland and Delaware, in addition to ministries in Latin America and Africa. It includes, since 6 April 2016, the Convocation of the West, formerly the Diocese of the West of the Reformed Episcopal Church. The diocese' first bishop was William H. Ilgenfritz, from 2009 to 2021, and their current bishop is Richard W. Lipka, since 2021. The first vicar general of the Convocation of the West was Winfield Mott, briefly in 2016, until he was replaced by Canon Michael Lenfied.

The diocese is Anglo-Catholic in faith and practice. Its institutional origins are in Forward in Faith North America (FIFNA), (the North American Branch of the U.K. based Forward in Faith - FiF) and the MDAS is the principal jurisdictional body representing FIFNA in ACNA.

MDAS was inaugurated in June 2009 upon the formation of ACNA, and William H. Ilgenfritz was the first bishop of the FIFNA consecrated in ACNA on 22 August 2009, and was accepted as a full diocese in June 2013.

The MDAS has a concordat of intercommunion with the Iglesia Anglicana Carismatica, of Venezuela.

The standing committee of the Reformed Episcopal Diocese of the West, in February 2016, voted unanimously to become a convocation within the Missionary Diocese of All Saints, due to their small dimension and inability to have the support of the Reformed Episcopal Church to remain as a diocese. The last synod of the Diocese of the West, on 5–6 April 2016, was followed by the organizing synod of the Convocation of the West, on 6–7 April 2016. Winfield Mott was elected at the occasion the first vicar general of the Convocation of the West, which he was until 31 August 2016. He was succeeded by Canon Michael Lenfied.

References

External links
 

Anglican dioceses established in the 21st century
Anglican realignment dioceses
Dioceses of the Anglican Church in North America